Mace Lewin Goodridge (born 13 September 1999) is an English professional footballer who plays for Buxton as a midfielder.

Career
Goodridge played youth football for Manchester City, Newcastle United and Burnley. Goodridge arrvied at Burnley from Newcastle United in 2018. He signed a new contract with Burnley in February 2020, which was a reward for the difficult first season he had at the club after initially impressing Academy manager Jon Pepper. He had picked up a cruciate ligament injury from an innocuous challenge in training that had kept him out of action for almost a year. He also spent some time with the first-team, featuring on the bench twice in the 2019–20 season before football was suspended for COVID-19. He moved on loan to Barrow in February 2021. In May 2021 it was announced that Goodridge would be leaving the club after three years, following the expiration of his contract.

In October 2021 he signed for Chorley.

In December 2021 he signed for AFC Telford United.

In July 2022 he signed for Buxton.

References

1999 births
Living people
English footballers
Manchester City F.C. players
Newcastle United F.C. players
Burnley F.C. players
Barrow A.F.C. players
Chorley F.C. players
AFC Telford United players
Buxton F.C. players
English Football League players
Association football midfielders
National League (English football) players